The Raging Fires is a fantasy novel by T. A. Barron originally published by Penguin in 1998. The Raging Fires is the third book in a 12-book series known as The Merlin Saga. This book was originally published as The Fires of Merlin, book three of The Lost Years of Merlin epic, a 5-book series providing a childhood story for the legendary Merlin, wizard of Arthurian legend.

Wings of Fire, the once-sleeping dragon, now threatens Fincayra with his raging fury.  Merlin, whose magical powers are new and unproven, is the only one who can stop him - though it could cost the young wizard his life.

Before facing the dragon's fires, Merlin must confront several others: the dreaded kreelixes, who live to devour magic; the mysterious Wheel of Wye; the sorceress Domnu, who holds the treasured Galator; and perhaps most importantly and most challenging, those fires within himself.

References

1998 American novels
1998 children's books
Modern Arthurian fiction
American children's novels
Children's fantasy novels
American young adult novels
American fantasy novels
Dragons in popular culture
Works based on Merlin
American children's books